Jörg Bergmeister (born 13 February 1976, in Leverkusen) is a former racing driver from Germany and an ambassador of Porsche.

His late father, Willi Bergmeister, owned a workshop and dealership where Michael Schumacher learned his trade as a car mechanic in the 1980s.

Since 1996, Jörg has raced in the Porsche Carrera Cup. In 2006 he won the Grand-American Rolex Series Championship. He also won the 2003 24 Hours of Daytona overall in a Porsche 911 GT3-RS. His most recent achievement is 1st place at the 24 Hours of Daytona in the GT Class with TRG.

He also won the Porsche Supercup in 2001, and the German Cup in 2000. He is one of the tallest sport car drivers at 6'4". He also has a degree in economics.  As of 2010, he drives for Flying Lizard Motorsports in the American Le Mans Series and the 24 Hours of Le Mans and BMS Scuderia Italia in the FIA GT2 European Championship.

Career 
 2010 – 1st place ALMS GT Class Driver's Championship (Porsche 911 GT3-RSR)
 2010 – 1st place 24 Hour of Spa (Porsche 911 GT3-RSR)
 2009 – 1st place ALMS GT2 Class Driver's Championship (Porsche 911 GT3-RSR)
 2009 – 1st place GT Class 24 Hours of Daytona
 2008 – 1st place ALMS GT2 Class Driver's Championship (Porsche 911 GT3-RSR)
 2006 – 1st place ALMS GT2 Class Driver's Championship (Porsche 911 GT3-RSR)
 2006 – 1st place Grand-Am Daytona Prototype Driver's Championship
 2005 – 1st place ALMS GT2 Class Driver's Championship (Porsche 911 GT3-RSR), 4th Place Daytona Prototype Grand-Am
 2004 – 1st place GT Class 24 Hours of Le Mans
 2003 – 3rd place ALMS GT Class (Porsche 911 GT3-RS), 1st place 24 Hours of Daytona Overall win
 2002 – 4th place ALMS Class (Porsche 911 GT3-RS), 1st place GT Class 24 Hours of Daytona
 2001 – 2nd place Porsche Carrera Cup, 1st place Porsche Supercup
 2000 – 1st place Porsche Carrera Cup, 6th place Porsche Supercup
 1999 – 3rd place Porsche Carrera Cup
 1998 – 9th place Porsche Carrera Cup
 1997 – 6th place Formula Opel Euroseries
 1996 – 7th place Porsche Carrera Cup
 1995 – 2nd place Formula Opel
 1994 – Deutsche Formula Renault Masterseries
 1993 – 1st place Formula König
 1992 – 3rd place Formula König

24 Hours of Le Mans results

Complete FIA World Endurance Championship results
(key) (Races in bold indicate pole position; races in
italics indicate fastest lap)

IMSA SportsCar Championship results
(key)

References

External links 

 Bergmeister company

1976 births
Living people
German racing drivers
Rolex Sports Car Series drivers
Sportspeople from Leverkusen
Racing drivers from North Rhine-Westphalia
American Le Mans Series drivers
FIA GT Championship drivers
24 Hours of Le Mans drivers
24 Hours of Daytona drivers
Supercars Championship drivers
EFDA Nations Cup drivers
Porsche Supercup drivers
Super GT drivers
FIA World Endurance Championship drivers
Blancpain Endurance Series drivers
ADAC GT Masters drivers
WeatherTech SportsCar Championship drivers
24 Hours of Spa drivers
Porsche Motorsports drivers
KCMG drivers
Kelly Racing drivers
Nürburgring 24 Hours drivers
Porsche Carrera Cup Germany drivers